National Cycle Network (NCN) Route 141 is a Sustrans Regional Route. It provides a connection between Route 14 and Route 72 along the south bank of the River Tyne through Gateshead. The full length of the route is part of the Keelmans Way. It is fully signed and open; however, the section between Wylam and Ryton Golf Course is currently closed due to a landslip.

Route 
NCN 141 starts at National Cycle Route 72, in Wylam on the north bank of the River Tyne. It crosses the river on Wylam Bridge before heading east via an off road route along the south bank of the Tyne. It passes Tyneside Golf Club, Ryton Willows and Blaydon before reaching its eastern trailhead at Derwenthaugh (in Swalwell) where it meets National Cycle Route 14.

The eastern end of the route was opened in 2012 so cyclists could avoid having to cross the busy Newburn Bridge to reach route 72. There are public artworks as the route passes the site of the Blaydon racecourse.

2021 Closure 
The route is closed between Wylam and Ryton due to a landslip that occurred in February 2021. A diversion route is being devised but has not yet been agreed.

Related NCN Routes 
Route 141 meets the following routes:

Route 141 is part of the Keelmans Way along with Route 14

References

External links

 

Cycleways in England
National Cycle Routes